Davona Dale (1976–1997) was an American Hall of Fame Champion Thoroughbred racehorse.

Background
Owned and bred by Calumet Farm, her sire descends from Nearco and her damsire is Hall of Famer Tim Tam who won the Kentucky Derby and Preakness Stakes.

Racing career 
Racing at age two, Davona Dale won once and finished off the board in the other but at age three, dominated American filly races. In 1979 Davona Dale won eight straight races and became the only filly in American thoroughbred history to win both the National Triple Tiara (the three feature filly races on thoroughbred racing's Triple Crown weekend) and the New York Triple Tiara of Thoroughbred Racing. She won the national triple by sweeping the Kentucky Oaks at Churchill Downs, the Black-Eyed Susan Stakes (now the George E. Mitchell Stakes) at Pimlico Race Course and the Acorn Stakes at Belmont Park. Her second triple occurred all at Belmont Park when she won the Acorn Stakes, the Mother Goose Stakes and the Coaching Club American Oaks. Her performances earned her the 1979 Eclipse Award for Outstanding 3-Year-Old Filly. That season, she also ran in the Travers Stakes against Colts.  She finished fourth.

At age 4, ankle and tendon injuries limited Davona Dale to just three races out of which she won the Ballerina Handicap before being retired to broodmare duties at Calumet Farm.

Honours
In 1985, Davona Dale was inducted into the United States' National Museum of Racing and Hall of Fame. In 2003 she inducted into the Fair Grounds Racing Hall of Fame.

References

1976 racehorse births
1997 racehorse deaths
Racehorses bred in Kentucky
Racehorses trained in the United States
Eclipse Award winners
Triple Crown of Thoroughbred Racing winners
United States Thoroughbred Racing Hall of Fame inductees
Kentucky Oaks winners
Thoroughbred family 3-l